DTSA may refer to:

 Defense Technology Security Administration, see Assistant Secretary of Defense for Global Strategic Affairs
 Defend Trade Secrets Act, a United States federal law relating to trade secrets